Irish Cove (Golhamkitk) is a small community in the Canadian province of Nova Scotia, spanning the border that divides Richmond County and Cape Breton County. The community is also home to a provincial picnic park.

References

Irish Cove on Destination Nova Scotia

Communities in Richmond County, Nova Scotia
General Service Areas in Nova Scotia